Badminton was contested at the 1986 Asian Games in Seoul, South Korea from 27 September to 4 October.

Singles, doubles, and team events were contested for both men and women. Mixed Doubles were also contested. All events were held at Olympic Gymnastics Arena.

Medalists

Medal table

Participating nations
A total of 98 athletes from 11 nations competed in badminton at the 1986 Asian Games:

References
Finals results

External links
Badminton Asia

 
1986 Asian Games events
1986
Asian Games
1986 Asian Games